An election to the Carmarthenshire County Council was held in April 1964. It was preceded by the 1961 election and followed by the 1967 election.

Overview of the result

As in previous years there was a close run election. Labour had increased their majority by taking up 15 of the 19 aldermanic seats following the previous two elections.

Boundary changes

There were no boundary changes at this election.

Retiring aldermen
A number of retiring Labour councillors stood down to allow retiring aldermen to be returned unopposed.

Unopposed returns

A large number of members were again returned unopposed.

Contested elections

Of the contests that took place, the most heated was in Llanarthney, where Labour Alderman Edgar Lewis, a member of the authority since 1931 (and who had not faced a contested election since the 1930s) was opposed by Ratepayer Austin Griffiths, a retired colonial officer who had captured the seat at a by-election.

In St Ishmaels, Labour councillor C.J. Burgess, who had won the seat by a narrow margin at the previous election, had left the Labour group shortly before the election, but narrowly held the seat against another labour candidate.

Summary of results
This section summarises the detailed results which are noted in the following sections. This table summarises the result of the elections in all wards. 59 councillors were elected.

|}

|}

|}

Ward results

Abergwili

Ammanford No.1

Ammanford No.2

Berwick

Burry Port East

Burry Port West

Caio

Carmarthen Division 1

Carmarthen Division 2

Carmarthen Division 3

Cenarth

Cilycwm

Conwil

Cwmamman

Felinfoel

Hengoed

Kidwelly

Laugharne

Llanarthney

Llanboidy

Llandebie North

Llandebie South

Llandilo Rural

Llandilo Urban
Labour had won the seat in a by-election the previous October.

Llandovery

Llandyssilio

Llanedy

Llanegwad

Llanelly Division.1

Llanelly Division 2

Llanelly Division 3

Llanelly Division 4

Llanelly Division 5

Llanelly Division 6

Llanelly Division 7

Llanelly Division 8

Llanelly Division 9

Llanfihangel Aberbythych

Llanfihangel-ar-Arth

Llangadog

Llangeler

Llangendeirne

Llangennech

Llangunnor

Llanon

Llansawel

Llanstephan

Llanybyther

Myddfai

Pembrey

Pontyberem

Quarter Bach

Rhydcymerau

St Clears

St Ishmaels
Burgess had been elected as a Labour candidate in 1961

Trelech

Trimsaran

Westfa

Whitland

Election of aldermen

In addition to the 59 councillors the council consisted of 19 county aldermen. Aldermen were elected by the council, and served a six-year term. Following the elections, the majority of the aldermanic seats were taken by Labour.

References

1964
1964 Welsh local elections
20th century in Carmarthenshire